Taishin Financial is a financial services company headquartered in Taipei, Taiwan. Taishin Financial Holdings consists of subsidiaries in the sectors of banking, securities, bills finance, assets management, and venture capital.

The company's main subsidiary, Taishin Futures Co., Ltd., is a Taiwanese brokerage with headquarters in Taipei.  It was founded in 1997 as a joint venture between Taishin Securities Co., Ltd. and Taishin International Bank, and is a member of the Taishin Financial Holdings. It involves in futures including brokerage, consultation, management and dealer business. The company is a member of Taiwan Futures Exchange.

See also
 List of banks in Taiwan
 Economy of Taiwan
 List of companies of Taiwan

References

Taiwanese companies established in 2002
Companies based in Taipei
Financial services companies of Taiwan
Holding companies established in 2002
Holding companies of Taiwan